is a 1968 Japanese fantasy horror film directed by Tokuzō Tanaka and produced by Daiei Film. The film is an expanded adaptation of the Yuki-onna short story as it appeared in the 1904 collection Kwaidan: Stories and Studies of Strange Things by Lafcadio Hearn.

Plot 

In the midst of a snow storm, an evil witch changes the lives of a master sculptor and his apprentice forever.

Cast 
 Shiho Fujimura as Yuki
 Machiko Hasegawa as Wife
 Akira Ishihama as Yosaku
 Taketoshi Naitō as Mino Gonmori
 Yoshiro Kitahara as Jōjin
 Sachiko Murase as Soyo
 Suga Fujio as Soju
 Mizuho Suzuki as Gyokei
 Masao Shimizu as Jiun
 Shinya Saitō as Taro
 Jutaro Hojo as Matsukawa
 Tatsuo Hananuno as Shigeruasa
 Hara Izumi as Miko
 Tokio Oki as Doctor A
 Jun Fujikawa as Doctor B
 Yukio Horikita as Guard
 Ichi Koshikawa as Man of the Agency

Release 
The Snow Woman was released in Japan on April 20, 1968. It was released in the United States as Snow Ghost by Daiei International Films with English subtitles in 1969. The film was released on VHS by Daiei Home Video on July 8, 1994 and on DVD on July 25, 2014 by Kadokawa Shoten.

References

Sources

External links 
 

1968 films
1968 horror films
Japanese horror films
Daiei Film films
Japanese fantasy films
Films directed by Tokuzō Tanaka
1960s Japanese films